is a railway station in the city of Owariasahi, Aichi Prefecture,  Japan, operated by Meitetsu.

Lines

Station layout
The station has two opposed side platforms connected by a footbridge. The station has automated ticket machines, Manaca automated turnstiles and is staffed.

Platforms

Adjacent stations

|-
!colspan=5|Nagoya Railroad

Station history
Sangō Station was opened on April 2, 1905, as a station on the privately operated Seto Electric Railway. The Seto Electric Railway was absorbed into the Meitetsu group on September 1, 1939.

Passenger statistics
In fiscal 2017, the station was used by an average of 10,012 passengers daily.

Surrounding area
Owariasahi Higashi Junior High School

See also
 List of Railway Stations in Japan

References

External links

 Official web page 

Railway stations in Japan opened in 1905
Railway stations in Aichi Prefecture
Stations of Nagoya Railroad
Owariasahi, Aichi